Tuareg  is a thriller novel written by Spanish author Alberto Vázquez-Figueroa. This novel was his most critically and commercially successful, with global sales in excess of 5,000,000 copies. It was adapted into a 1984 movie starring Mark Harmon, Tuareg – The Desert Warrior.

This is the first book in the Tuareg trilogy, followed by Los Ojos del Tuareg and El Último Tuareg.

Plot
One day, two old men and a boy appeared in Gacel Shayah's camp in the Sahara. He, a noble inmouchar observing the millennial tradition of the desert, sheltered travelers. But he failed to protect them. People in dusty military uniforms violated the ancient hospitality law. They killed the boy and took one old man away. Gasel Shayah remembers the great commandment of the Tuareg people: your guest is under your protection. Therefore, he has to seek vengeance.

References

1980 novels
Novels set in Africa
20th-century Spanish novels
Fiction set in 1980